Ripper is a 1996 interactive movie point-and-click adventure game developed and published by Take-Two Interactive for MS-DOS and Macintosh. The cast includes Christopher Walken, Paul Giamatti, Karen Allen, Burgess Meredith (in his final performance before his death the following year), David Patrick Kelly, Ossie Davis, and John Rhys-Davies. It also uses the Blue Öyster Cult song "(Don't Fear) The Reaper". The villain of the game is chosen at random from the four main characters. A limited number of the clues and puzzles, plus a single line of dialogue in the ending, change according to the villain's identity.

In 1996 home ports for the Saturn and PlayStation were announced, but did not ship. Ripper is the second of the three Take-Two developed full-motion video-based adventure games, the other two being Hell: A Cyberpunk Thriller and Black Dahlia.

Plot
Ripper takes place in New York City in the year 2040. It opens with the investigation of the recent murder of Renee Stein, the third victim of a serial killer known as "The Ripper", largely out of the modus operandi similarity to Jack the Ripper. The player assumes the role of Jake Quinlan, a reporter for the Virtual Herald, whom The Ripper sends messages to detailing his murders (an act attributed to Jack the Ripper, although no letters have been proven to come from him). Along with the police (whose investigation is headed by Detective Vincent Magnotta), Quinlan is seeking The Ripper's true identity.

After investigating Renee Stein's murder, Quinlan receives a message from The Ripper, who warns Quinlan that his girlfriend, Catherine Powell, will be the next victim, as she has gotten too close to discovering his identity. Quinlan manages to find Powell still alive, but in a coma "deeper than anyone thought possible." Cybersurgeon Claire Burton at the Meta-Cognition Center of the Tribeca Center Hospital manages to retrieve a distorted image of Powell's attacker, but requires additional information from Quinlan to make it clearer. (This is also a reference to Jack the Ripper, as the police hypothesized that they might be able to get an image of the killer from the retinas of the victims.) He provides this through investigating into what Powell was on to in her investigation and homes in on three possible suspects for The Ripper's murders. In order to transmit this information into Powell's brain directly, he enlists the help of Joey Falconetti, a hacker who specializes in interfacing directly with the human brain.

Quinlan's investigation leads him to discover that all of The Ripper's victims and all of those associated with the investigation of The Ripper (except Quinlan himself) were involved with an old gaming group known as the Web Runners, who played a game based on the Jack the Ripper mystery. The last session of this game somehow caused one of the players to die in real life. The player that died happened to be Catherine Powell's mother. Assistance from a pathologist named Vic Farley reveals that The Ripper's murders were done by placing a code into a victim's brain while in cyberspace that caused their internal body pressure to rise to a point of explosion, which Farley experiences immediately after providing his explanation. Quinlan also finds a cyberspace weapon developed by a murdered cyberarchitect named Hamilton Wofford, designed specifically to kill The Ripper inside a virtual recreation of the historic Whitechapel district of London, where the Jack the Ripper murders took place. After assembling the weapon and gathering the necessary protection from The Ripper's weapon, Quinlan enters cyberspace, kills The Ripper, and manages to escape the virtual Whitechapel in time to escape its destruction.

The Ripper can be one of four possible suspects: Joey Falconetti, Claire Burton, Vincent Magnotta, or Catherine Powell. With each play-through, certain clues and actual identity of The Ripper vary, though the bulk of the story is unchanged, and clues indicating the guilt of all four suspects will appear regardless of who the killer is. For instance, Catherine Powell experiences mysterious surges in brain wave activity that coincide with all the Ripper's murders regardless of whether or not she actually is the Ripper, and no alternative explanation for these surges is provided. However, the changes in the game's story and puzzles are limited to the game's third act- after Farley's death.

Cast

 Christopher Walken as Detective Vince Magnotta; a violent police officer with a romantic interest in Clare Burton and a vendetta against Falconetti. When Catherine's mother died during their last Ripper game, Magnotta arrested Falconetti for the murder. Magnotta is convinced that Falconetti is the Ripper, but his obsession may simply be a ruse to cover the fact that Magnotta himself is the Ripper. Magnotta may also be eager to frame Falconetti as the Ripper so that he can collect a large bounty for solving the case. Over the course of the investigation, Magnotta becomes increasingly more hostile towards Quinlan, believing him to be the Ripper due to the circumstances of Quinlan's encounters with the Ripper and their victims.
 Burgess Meredith as Hamilton Wofford / Covington Wofford; two brothers that live on the outskirts of New York City. Hamilton was a Cyber-Architect who built virtual worlds based on historic locations. Hamilton was hired by the Ripper to build a replica of Whitechapel. Hamilton is murdered prior to the start of the game, but Quinlan eventually finds an AI created by Hamilton that provides him with critical information. Covington- in his brother's absence- is a recluse and seems to have gradually lost his grip on sanity.
 Karen Allen as Doctor Clare Burton; a brilliant, but seemingly cold and distant doctor that specializes in the human brain. Burton is the object of affection of both Magnotta and Falconetti, both of whom have made Burton's life chaotic. Burton arouses suspicion of being the Ripper when she appears to stall treating Catherine- the only surviving Ripper victim. It is later revealed that Burton invented the weapon that the Ripper uses in his murders. Burton claims that the weapon was stolen, but whether this is true depends on whether Burton is the Ripper or not.
 David Patrick Kelly as Joey Falconetti; a brilliant, though seemingly violent and disturbed computer hacker. Falconetti immediately draws suspicion of being the Ripper with his fascination with knife collecting and his fascination with the Ripper himself. Falconetti was married to Clare Burton, but the two divorced after Magnotta arrested Falconetti. Joey now has a vendetta for Magnotta and Burton, though he still has feelings for the latter.
 Scott Cohen as Jake Quinlan; an investigative reporter who is investigating and writing about the Ripper murders. Quinlan regularly receives letters and messages from the Ripper, and Quinlan is forced into chasing the Ripper when his assistant and lover- Catherine Powell- is attacked by the Ripper. Quinlan is not well versed in the workings of cyberspace; thus the player must learn how the technology of the game world works as Quinlan learns it himself.
 Ossie Davis as Ben Dodds; the editor of the Virtual Herald whom Quinlan confides in.
 John Rhys-Davies as Vigo Haman; a mobster that has valuable information regarding Clare Burton.
 Tahnee Welch as Catherine Powell; Quinlan's co-worker and lover. Powell begins investigating the Ripper behind Quinlan's back, hoping to take the story and launch her own career as a reporter. Powell is comatose for most of the game, but it is discovered late in the game that her brain activity spikes each day that the Ripper kills; making Catherine a viable suspect. The suspicion that Catherine may be the Ripper is heightened when it's discovered that her mother was killed in the last Ripper Web Runners game, and Catherine was aware of this fact.
 Jimmie Walker as Soap Beatty; a computer hacker who is one of Catherine's primary sources in her investigation of the Ripper. He gives the player much insight into the computer technology of the game.
 Steven Randazzo as Sgt. Lou Brannon; a rare non-corrupt cop that gives the player information about Magnotta's suspicious activities.
 Peter Boyden as Vic Farley; a friendly pathologist who is trying to figure out how the Ripper commits his murders.
 Paul Giamatti as Doctor Bud Cable; a doctor tending to Catherine Powell who keeps the player up to date about Catherine's condition when Doctor Burton stalls treating her.
 MacIntyre Dixon as Gambit Nelson; a cyberspace entrepreneur who gives the player critical information about Falconetti.
 Lianna Pai as Kashi Yamamoto; A current Web Runner who gives the player information about the Runners' history.
 David Thornton as Twig; an assistant that maintains Falconetti's computer hacking equipment.
 Kira Arne as Vivien Santiago; the receptionist at the hospital who flirts with Quinlan and informs Quinlan of suspicious activities at the hospital.
 William Seymour as Bob Eppels; a pathologist who replaces Farley after Farley is fired. Suspiciously, Eppels is seemingly under instruction not to give Quinlan any information, though he slips up and tells Quinlan secrets about the hospital.
 Richard Bright as Dr. Karl Stasiak; a forensic photographer who is a trusted source of Quinlan's. Unfortunately Karl gets freaked out by the Ripper's attacks and leaves New York, depriving Quinlan of a trusted source in the police department.
 Phyllis Bash as Prof. Lillian Bech; a Professor who sheds some light on Clare Burton's past. She first informs Quinlan of the Web Runners' existence.

Development
Considerable effort was focused on the game's full motion video sequences. Paying the game's slew of big-name actors cost nearly 25% of the game's entire budget, and Phil Parmet was brought on to direct the video segments. Writer/lead designer F. J. Lennon commented, "The whole industry wants to crucify FMV, people claim FMV doesn't belong in game, but if it's done professionally, I think it can work."

The game engine was created from scratch. It can change resolution between 640x480 and 320x200 on the fly.

It was launched in February 1996.

Reception

Take 2 announced shipments of 160,000 copies to retailers during the game's debut week, and called it "our biggest game to date". According to Take 2, the game sold over 150,000 units by the end of October 1997 and earned 28.7% of all company revenue during that fiscal year, suggesting that as of 31 October 1997 (eight months after its release), Ripper had achieved sales of approximately $3,587,500. Arinn Dembo of CNET Gamecenter wrote, "[S]low sales, unfortunately, quickly knocked [Ripper] off retail shelves."

The game received an average score of 71.50% at GameRankings, based on an aggregate of 4 reviews. A reviewer for Next Generation commented, "One minute the game believes it's a graphic adventure, the next it's a movie, and the next it's a puzzle game. If any one of these aspects would be perfected, it could be a gamer's delight. As it stands, the game is mediocre in each category." He specifically criticized that the characters "are so overdone it's just plain funny" and the first-person sequences can't be bypassed, forcing the player to watch the same graphics every time they backtrack.

Jeff Sengstack of NewMedia magazine wrote that Ripper "meets, even exceeds, its pre-release hype", and summarized it as "an engaging horror mystery with immense depth." However, he found fault with the video compression and difficulty.

References

External links
Official site (archived)

1996 video games
Cancelled PlayStation (console) games
Cancelled Sega Saturn games
Cyberpunk video games
Detective video games
DOS games
Fiction set in 2040
Full motion video based games
Interactive movie video games
Classic Mac OS games
Point-and-click adventure games
Single-player video games
Take-Two Interactive games
Video games about Jack the Ripper
Video games about virtual reality
Video games developed in the United States
Video games set in the 2040s
Video games with alternate endings